Guwahati-Dibrugarh Shatabdi Express is a Shatabdi Express category type of service belonging to Northeast Frontier Railway zone that runs between  and  in India.

Coaches

The 12085/ 86   Shatabdi Express presently has 6 AC Chair Car & 2 End on Generator coaches. It does not carry any AC Executive Chair Car Coach & Anubhuti coach like other Shatabdi Express. Also it does not carry a Pantry car coach but being a Shatabdi category train, catering is arranged on board the train.

As is customary with most train services in India, Coach Composition may be amended at the discretion of Indian Railways depending on demand.

Service

The 12085 / 12086   Shatabdi Express covers the distance of 506 kilometres in 09 hours 05 mins in both directions.

The average speed of the train is 75 km/hr (46.6 mi/hr).

Routeing

Being a Shatabdi class train, it returns to its originating station  on next day and also it Shares Rakes with 12087/88 Naharlagun−Guwahati Shatabdi Express

References

External links
 12085 Shatabdi Express at India Rail Info
 12086 Shatabdi Express at India Rail Info

Shatabdi Express trains
Rail transport in Assam
Transport in Guwahati
Transport in Dibrugarh